Andreas Paouris (born 13 November 1902, date of death unknown) was a Greek long-distance runner. He competed in the men's 5000 metres at the 1928 Summer Olympics.

References

External links
 

1902 births
Year of death missing
Athletes (track and field) at the 1928 Summer Olympics
Greek male long-distance runners
Olympic athletes of Greece
Place of birth missing
People from Kea (island)
Sportspeople from the South Aegean